The amphibians of Malaysia are diverse.

Species

 Amolops larutensis
 Angular caecilian
 Ansonia albomaculata
 Ansonia endauensis
 Ansonia hanitschi
 Ansonia latidisca
 Ansonia minuta
 Ansonia torrentis
 Borneophrys edwardinae
 Bufo asper
 Calluella brooksii
 Calluella flava
 Calluella guttulata
 Calluella volzi
 Caudacaecilia asplenia
 Caudacaecilia larutensis
 Caudacaecilia nigroflava
 Chaperina fusca
 Chiromantis nongkhorensis
 Duttaphrynus melanostictus
 Fejervarya cancrivora
 Fejervarya limnocharis
 Fejervarya pulla
 Hoplobatrachus rugulosus
 Huia cavitympanum
 Humerana miopus
 Hylarana banjarana
 Hylarana baramica
 Hylarana erythraea
 Hylarana glandulosa
 Hylarana laterimaculata
 Hylarana luctuosa
 Hylarana macrodactyla
 Hylarana nigrovittata
 Hylarana siberu
 Hylarana signata
 Ichthyophis atricollaris
 Ichthyophis dulitensis
 Ichthyophis monochrous
 Ingerana tenasserimensis
 Ingerophrynus divergens
 Ingerophrynus gollum
 Ingerophrynus kumquat
 Ingerophrynus macrotis
 Ingerophrynus parvus
 Ingerophrynus quadriporcatus
 Kaloula pulchra
 Kurixalus appendiculatus
 Leptobrachella baluensis
 Leptobrachella brevicrus
 Leptobrachella mjobergi
 Leptobrachella palmata
 Leptobrachella parva
 Leptobrachella serasanae
 Leptobrachium hendricksoni
 Leptobrachium smithi
 Leptolalax arayai
 Leptolalax dringi
 Leptolalax gracilis
 Leptolalax hamidi
 Leptolalax heteropus
 Leptolalax kajangensis
 Leptolalax kecil
 Leptolalax maurus
 Leptolalax pictus
 Limnonectes blythii
 Limnonectes doriae
 Limnonectes finchi
 Limnonectes hascheanus
 Limnonectes ibanorum
 Limnonectes ingeri
 Limnonectes kenepaiensis
 Limnonectes kuhlii
 Limnonectes laticeps
 Limnonectes leporinus
 Limnonectes malesianus
 Limnonectes nitidus
 Limnonectes tweediei
 Odorrana hosii
 Megophrys kobayashii
 Megophrys nasuta
 Meristogenys jerboa
 Meristogenys macrophthalmus
 Meristogenys orphnocnemis
 Meristogenys whiteheadi
 Microhyla berdmorei
 Microhyla butleri
 Microhyla fissipes
 Microhyla heymonsi
 Microhyla mantheyi
 Microhyla palmipes
 Microhyla superciliaris
 Micryletta inornata
 Occidozyga baluensis
 Occidozyga martensii
 Odorrana monjerai
 Occidozyga lima
 Pelophryne guentheri
 Philautus amoenus
 Philautus aurantium
 Philautus bunitus
 Philautus disgregus
 Philautus erythrophthalmus
 Philautus gunungensis
 Philautus petersi
 Philautus saueri
 Pulchrana picturata
 Raorchestes parvulus
 Rhacophorus angulirostris
 Rhacophorus baluensis
 Rhacophorus bipunctatus
 Rhacophorus nigropalmatus
 Rhacophorus pardalis
 Staurois latopalmatus
 Theloderma asperum
 Theloderma leporosum
 Xenophrys aceras
 Xenophrys baluensis
 Xenophrys dringi
 Xenophrys longipes

Sources 

 

Malaysia
Malaysia
amphibians